The moncho-jo was an administrative part of the Kamakura shogunate. It was a court of appeals that dealt with property disputes that could not be settled at a lower level, which prevented a lot of unnecessary property-based warfare.

See also
 Kamakura shogunate
 Kamakura period

Kamakura period